Transcontinental and Western Air Flight 277 was a C-54 Skymaster en route from Stephenville, Newfoundland and Labrador, to Washington, D.C. on June 20, 1944.  The aircraft crashed on Fort Mountain, in Maine's Baxter State Park. All seven on board died, including six civilian crewmembers and one United States Army Air Force passenger.

The flight was a scheduled contract flight for Air Transport Command. The pilot, Roger "Rolley" Inman, apparently did not realize that the aircraft, flying at less than 4,000 feet, had been blown into mountainous territory with peaks in excess of 5,000 feet.

References

 

Aviation accidents and incidents in the United States in 1944
1944 in Maine
277
Airliner accidents and incidents in Maine
Airliner accidents and incidents caused by pilot error
Airliner accidents and incidents involving controlled flight into terrain
Disasters in Maine
Piscataquis County, Maine
Accidents and incidents involving the Douglas DC-4